Wangcheng Economic and Technological Development Zone (abbr: WETZ) is an economic and technical development zone (ETZ) in Wangcheng District of Changsha City, Hunan Province, China, one of four ETZs at state level in Changsha. It was established on 13 July 2000, its old name is the High - Tech Food Industrial Base of Hunan Province, similar to a development zone at provincial level; renamed to the present name in 21 July 2006. It was upgraded to an ETZ at state level on 15 February 2014.

The Wangcheng ETZ is located in the south west of the seat of Wangcheng District, it covers Baishazhou, Huangjinyuan, Jinshanqiao and Wushan 4 subdistricts. The dominant industries in the zone are non-ferrous metal new materials, food, electronic information and business logistics. As of 2015, there are 635 registered enterprises, 32 of the total are public or the global Top500 companies. The total industrial gross output in the zone hits 77 billion yuan (US$12.36 billion) and the industrial added value is 20 billion yuan (US$3.21 billion). In 2016, its total gross output of scale-sized industries reaches 90 billion yuan (US$13.55 billion).

References

2000 establishments in China
Wangcheng District
Special Economic Zones of China
Economy of Changsha